Blue hour is a period of twilight.

Blue Hour, Bluehour,  or The Blue Hour may also refer to:

 Bluehour, a defunct restaurant in Portland, Oregon
 Blue Hour, a 1960 jazz album
 The Blue Hour (album), a 2018 album by Suede
 The Blue Hour (1953 film), a West German comedy film directed by Veit Harlan
 The Blue Hour (2007 film), a 2007 American drama film
 The Blue Hour (2014 film), a 2014 Peruvian drama film
 The Blue Hour (2015 film), a 2015 Thai horror film
 The Blue Hour (novel), a 2005 novel
 Blue Hour (song), a song by Tomorrow X Together